Hi, Buddy is a 1943 American musical film directed by Harold Young and written by Warren Wilson. The film stars Dick Foran, Harriet Nelson, Robert Paige, Marjorie Lord, Bobs Watson, Tommy Cook, Jennifer Holt and Gus Schilling. The film was released on February 26, 1943, by Universal Pictures.

Plot

Cast         
Dick Foran as Dave O'Connor
Harriet Nelson as Gloria Bradley 
Robert Paige as Johnny Blake
Marjorie Lord as Mary Parker
Bobs Watson as Tim Martin
Tommy Cook as Spud Winslow
Jennifer Holt as Miss Lucille Russell
Gus Schilling as Downbeat Collins
Wade Boteler as Michael O'Shane
Drew Roddy as Pat O'Shane

References

External links
 

1943 films
American musical films
1943 musical films
Universal Pictures films
Films directed by Harold Young (director)
American black-and-white films
1940s English-language films
1940s American films